Glyphipterix codonias is a species of sedge moths in the genus Glyphipterix. It was described by Edward Meyrick in 1909. It is found in New Zealand.

References

Moths described in 1909
Glyphipterigidae
Moths of New Zealand